Velva-Baza is a rural locality (a settlement) in Oshibskoye Rural Settlement, Kudymkarsky District, Perm Krai, Russia. The population was 520 as of 2010. There are 13 streets.

Geography 
Velva-Baza is located 44 km northeast of Kudymkar (the district's administrative centre) by road. Novoselova is the nearest rural locality.

References 

Rural localities in Kudymkarsky District